Erfan Badi (born 17 July 1996) is an Iranian professional footballer who plays as a left-back for Azadegan League club Machine Sazi.

Career statistics

Club

References

1996 births
Living people
People from Qom
Iranian footballers
Saba players
Fajr Sepasi players
Machine Sazi F.C. players
Khooshe Talaei players
Persian Gulf Pro League players
Azadegan League players
Association football defenders